Marcin Żewłakow (born 22 April 1976) is a Polish football player.

Career
Żewłakow was born, in Warsaw. He played for clubs such as Polonia Warsaw, Beveren (Belgium), Excelsior Mouscron (Belgium), FC Metz (France) and AA Gent (Belgium) and APOEL (Cyprus).

With APOEL he won the 2008-09 Cypriot First Division and also the Cypriot Super Cup of 2008 and 2009. He also appeared in three official group stages matches of the 2009–10 UEFA Champions League with APOEL, scoring one goal against Chelsea in a 2–2 draw at Stamford Bridge.

National team
He also played for the Polish national team and played in the 2002 FIFA World Cup. He scored a goal against the USA.

Family
His twin brother Michał is also a footballer. They played together at Polonia, Beveren and Mouscron and were teammates on the National Team, playing in the 2002 FIFA World Cup.

References

External links
 

1976 births
Living people
Polish footballers
Polonia Warsaw players
K.S.K. Beveren players
R.E. Mouscron players
FC Metz players
K.A.A. Gent players
F.C.V. Dender E.H. players
Korona Kielce players
Poland international footballers
2002 FIFA World Cup players
Polish expatriate footballers
Expatriate footballers in Belgium
Ekstraklasa players
Belgian Pro League players
Ligue 1 players
Cypriot First Division players
APOEL FC players
Expatriate footballers in Cyprus
Expatriate footballers in France
Footballers from Warsaw
Twin sportspeople
GKS Bełchatów players
Hutnik Warsaw players
Association football forwards
Polish twins